Leader is a 1964 Indian Hindi-language political drama film directed by Ram Mukherjee, produced by Sashadhar Mukherjee and written by Dilip Kumar. The film stars Dilip Kumar, Vyjayanthimala and Jayant. The film underperformed commercially.

The film's music is by Naushad, with lyrics by Shakeel Badayuni, it is noted for the patriotic song "Apni Azaadi Ko Hum Hargiz Mita Sakte Nahin" and "Mujhe Duniyawalon Sharabi Na Samjho", by Mohammed Rafi.

Plot
Vijay Khanna is a law graduate-cum-tabloid editor. He falls in love with Princess Sunita, while general elections are underway. Vijay becomes accused of a political leader's murder. Gradually, the couple tries to expose a criminal-politician nexus.

Cast
Dilip Kumar as Vijay Khanna
Vyjayanthimala as Princess Sunita 
Nazir Hussain as Mr. Khanna 
Leela Mishra as Mrs. Khanna
Motilal as Acharya
Hiralal as Kargah
D. K. Sapru as King of Shah Garh 
Jayant as Diwan Mahendranath

Music

The score and soundtrack for the movie were composed by Naushad and the lyrics were penned by Shakeel Badayuni. The soundtrack consists of 8 songs, featuring vocals by Mohammed Rafi, Lata Mangeshkar and Asha Bhosle. Songs like "Tere Husn Ki Kya Tareef Karoon", "Mujhe Duniyawalon Sharabi Na Samjho", "Aaj Kal Shauq-E-Deedar Hai" and "Apni Azaadi Ko Hum Hargiz Mita Sakte Nahin" are popular songs.  The soundtrack album was reissued in digital format in 2004 through Saregama.

In the two songs "Aaj Hai Pyar Ka Faisla" & "Daiya Re Daiya", sung by Lata Mangeshkar & Asha Bhosle respectively, Mohammed Rafi has done small Alaap many times in between the songs.

Awards
Filmfare Award for Best Actor for Dilip Kumar

References

External links
 
 

1964 films
1960s Hindi-language films
Indian political films
Indian political drama films
Films about journalism
Films scored by Naushad
Films directed by Ram Mukherjee